Olivia Newman is an American film director and screenwriter. She is best known for directing First Match (2018) and Where the Crawdads Sing (2022).

Life and career 

Newman was born in Hoboken, New Jersey and graduated from The Hudson School in 1996. She holds a B.A. in French and women’s studies from Vassar College and an MFA in film from Columbia University. Her first short film, Blue-Eyed Mary, was shown at the Portland Oregon Women’s Film Festival in 2010.

Newman made her feature directorial debut with the drama film First Match starring Elvire Emanuelle, Yahya Abdul-Mateen II, Colman Domingo and Jharrel Jerome, which premiered at the SXSW Film Festival. First Match was released by Netflix in 2018. 

She directed the 2022 mystery thriller film Where The Crawdads Sing, an adaptation of the 2018 novel of the same name by Delia Owens. Despite mixed reviews from critics, audience reception was more positive and the film subsequently became a sleeper hit at the box-office, grossing $140 million on a $24 million budget.

Filmography
Short film

Feature film

Television

Accolades

References

External links
 
 

21st-century American screenwriters
21st-century American women writers
Living people
American women film directors
American women screenwriters
American television directors
American women television directors
Columbia University School of the Arts alumni
The Hudson School alumni
Vassar College alumni
Film directors from New Jersey
Screenwriters from New Jersey
Writers from Hoboken, New Jersey
Year of birth missing (living people)